Love Tracks is the sixth studio album by Gloria Gaynor, released in November 1978 on Polydor Records.

History
Love Tracks includes her million-selling #1 hit single "I Will Survive" which originally started out as the b-side to the album's first single, a cover of Clout's "Substitute" before it was flipped. (The 12" single was quickly deleted and the 4:56 album version was replaced with the 8:01 12" version in order to sell more albums).

The song "Anybody Wanna Party" also became a hit, becoming a top 20 hit on the club/dance chart, as well as peaking at #16 on the R&B chart.

The album was remastered and reissued with bonus tracks in 2013 by Big Break Records.

Track listing

Personnel
Gloria Gaynor – vocals
James Gadson – drums
Bob "Boogie" Bowles, Wah Wah Watson, Robert White – guitar
Peter Robinson, Freddie Perren – keyboards
Eddie Watkins, Scott Edwards – bass guitar
Paulinho da Costa, Bob Zimmitti – percussion
Peter Robinson – synthesizer
Gene Page – conductor, strings and horns ("Spotlight", "I Said Yes" and "Goin' Out of My Head")
Peter Robinson – conductor, strings and horns ("Anybody Wanna Party" and "Please Be There")
Don Peake – conductor, strings and horns ("You Can Exit")
Dave Blumberg – conductor, strings and horns ("I Will Survive" and "Substitute")
Julia Tillman Waters, Maxine Willard Waters, Stephanie Spruill – backing vocals

Production
Dino Fekaris, Freddie Perren – producers
Freddie Perren – rhythm arrangements
Benjamin Barrett – contractor
Lewis Peters, Jack Rouben – recording and remix engineers
Rick Clifford – assistant engineer
Ed Biggs – mastering
Bob Heimall – design

Charts

Certifications

References

External links
 

1978 albums
Gloria Gaynor albums
Albums arranged by Gene Page
Albums produced by Freddie Perren
Polydor Records albums